The 2007 Palmer Cup was held on June 7–8, 2007 on the Caves Valley Golf Club, Owings Mills, Maryland. The United States won 18 to 6. Europe took a 3–1 lead on the first morning but the United States won all 8 of the afternoon singles matches to lead 9–3.

Format
On Thursday, there were four matches of four-ball in the morning, followed by eight singles matches in the afternoon. Four foursomes matches were played on the Friday morning with a further eight singles in the afternoon. In all, 24 matches were played.

Each of the 24 matches was worth one point in the larger team competition. If a match was all square after the 18th hole, each side earned half a point toward their team total. The team that accumulated at least 12 points won the competition.

Teams
Eight college golfers from the United States and Europe participated in the event.

Thursday's matches

Morning four-ball

Afternoon singles

Friday's matches

Morning foursomes

Afternoon singles

Michael Carter award
The Michael Carter Award winners were Jonathan Moore and Rhys Davies.

References

External links
Palmer Cup official site

Arnold Palmer Cup
Golf in Maryland
Palmer Cup
Palmer Cup
Palmer Cup
Palmer Cup